Sten Pentus (born 3 November 1981 in Tallinn) is an Estonian racing driver.

He is a former Estonian Formula 4 Champion, and a previous winner of the Formula Baltic championship in a Reynard 903.

At the end of the 2008 season, Pentus tested for GP2 Series teams DPR and Racing Engineering with respectable results considering his previous racing experience. In November, he tested with Fortec Motorsport in the Formula Renault 3.5 Series test in Valencia and again impressed, comparing favourably with F3 graduates Edoardo Mortara and Jaime Alguersuari during the two days. Fortec would later sign Pentus for the 2009 season on January 30, 2009. He scored his first points in the series when he finished second in the feature race at the Circuit de Catalunya, having started nineteenth. This earned Pentus a bonus point for the most places gained in the race. He achieved that again in the feature race at Spa, qualifying 19th and finishing 11th. He went on to finish sixteenth in the overall standings and finished sixth in the rookie championship overall standings.

Pentus stayed with Fortec to compete in the 2010 Formula Renault 3.5 Series. Pentus took his first win in the series, winning the second race at the season-opening round of the season at Ciudad del Motor de Aragón and second win in Hungaroring. He finished the 2010 season in 4th place overall. Pentus joined EPIC Racing team for the 2011 season, and eventually finished the disappointing season 24th.

In 2014 Sten Pentus switched from single-seaters to GT racing, competing in the Blancpain Sprint series with the Bhaitech team in a McLaren MP4-12C GT3.

Racing record

Complete Formula Renault 3.5 Series results

(key) (Races in bold indicate pole position) (Races in italics indicate fastest lap)

Complete Auto GP World Series results
(key)

Personal
His sister Keit Pentus-Rosimannus is a politician.

References

External links

 
 
 Official World Series by Renault webpage

1981 births
Living people
Sportspeople from Tallinn
Estonian racing drivers
British Formula Renault 2.0 drivers
Formula Renault BARC drivers
Formula Renault 2.0 NEC drivers
Formula Renault Eurocup drivers
Formula BMW ADAC drivers
Toyota Racing Series drivers
World Series Formula V8 3.5 drivers
Auto GP drivers
Comtec Racing drivers
Fortec Motorsport drivers
EPIC Racing drivers
Virtuosi Racing drivers
Bhaitech drivers
CRS Racing drivers